Corythoxestis tricalysiella is a moth of the family Gracillariidae. It is found in Okinawa, Japan.

The wingspan is 6.6–7 mm. The forewings are dark fuscous to greyish-purple with whitish spots. The hindwings are dark grey.

The larvae feed on Tricalysia dubia. They mine the leaves of their host plant. The mine has the form of a long serpentine and linear mine. The frass is brownish to blackish. Usually, there are one to three mines on a single leaf. Older larvae are yellow.

Etymology
The name is derived from Tricalysia, the scientific name of the host plant.

References

Moths described in 2013
Phyllocnistinae
Moths of Japan